Horace Leslie Hazell (born 30 September 1909, Brislington, Somerset and died 31 March 1990) was a cricketer who played for Somerset County Cricket Club in English first-class cricket.

A slow left-arm orthodox bowler and tail-end left-handed batsman, Hazell made his Somerset debut in 1929 and played fairly regularly from 1932 onwards. In pre-war cricket he was, though, inclined to be expensive and his figures suggest that he was under-bowled by the standards of the day. Only in 1936, when he took 87 wickets at an average of just over 21 runs apiece, did he suggest more than ordinary talent. 

Returning after the Second World War, however, Hazell developed into a highly accurate bowler who achieved success by pinning the batsmen down rather than through any great spin. For Somerset against Gloucestershire in 1949, he bowled 105 balls without conceding a run, including 17 consecutive maiden overs. He took 105 wickets in 1948 and 106 in 1949, in both seasons averaging less than 20 runs per wicket, and was still an effective bowler into his early 40s. At the end of Somerset's disastrous 1952 season, however, when he had again come top of the county's bowling averages, he was not re-engaged.

In his full career, Hazell took 957 wickets at 23.97. He was a reliable slip fielder and a popular, jovial, rotund figure.

External links
 
 

1909 births
1990 deaths
English cricketers
Somerset cricketers